Masiniyeh-ye Olya (also Romanized as Masīnīyeh-ye ‘Olyā and Moseynīyeh-ye ‘Olyā) is a village in Abdoliyeh-ye Gharbi Rural District, in the Central District of Ramshir County, Khuzestan Province, Iran. At the 2006 census, its population was 115, in 20 families.

References 

Populated places in Ramshir County